Heide Wollert (born 16 May 1982 in Halle, Saxony-Anhalt) is a German judoka.  She competes in the -78 kg weight-class.  She competed at the 2008 Summer Olympics, finishing in 7th.  At the 2012 Olympics, she was knocked out in the second round.

References

External links
 
 
 

1982 births
Living people
Sportspeople from Halle (Saale)
German female judoka
Judoka at the 2008 Summer Olympics
Judoka at the 2012 Summer Olympics
Olympic judoka of Germany
20th-century German women
21st-century German women